18 de Mayo or Dieciocho de Mayo is a city and municipality in the Canelones Department of Uruguay.

Establishment
After a process of evaluation at departmental level, this municipality was created in 15 March 2013.

It includes several towns, belonging until that date to the municipalities of Las Piedras and Progreso, in the old Route 5 area: Villa Alegria, Vista Linda, El Dorado, San Francisco, Villa Cristina, San Isidro, El Dorado Chico and Villa Foresti.

Its name commemorates the Battle of Las Piedras, which took place in 1811.

There is concern at the political and local level for giving this populous area a city status.

Government
The authority of the municipality is the Municipal Council, composed of the mayor and four councilors.

Mayors by period:

References

Populated places in the Canelones Department
Populated places established in 2013